The Roman Catholic Diocese of Shunde/Shunteh/Xingtai is a diocese located in the city of Xingtai (Hebei) in the Ecclesiastical province of Beijing in China.

History
 1933: Established as Apostolic Prefecture of Shundefu 順得府 from the Apostolic Vicariate of Zhengdingfu 正定府
 1944.01.13: Promoted as Apostolic Vicariate of Shundefu 順得府
 1946.04.11: Promoted as Diocese of Shunde 順得

Leadership
Bishops of Shunde 順得 (Roman rite):
 Bishop Guo Jinjun
 Bishop Joseph Hou Jinde (October 28, 1989 – May 20, 1994)
 Bishop Xiao Liren
 Bishop Inácio Krause, C.M. (April 11, 1946 – 1950)

Vicars Apostolic of Shundefu 順得府 (Roman Rite):
 Bishop Inácio Krause, C.M. (January 13, 1944 – April 11, 1946)

Prefects Apostolic of Shundefu 順得府 (Roman Rite):
 Fr. Inácio Krause, C.M. (later Bishop) (October 26, 1933 – January 13, 1944)

References

 GCatholic.org
 Catholic Hierarchy
 Diocese website (Chinese)

Roman Catholic dioceses in China
Christian organizations established in 1933
Roman Catholic dioceses and prelatures established in the 20th century
1933 establishments in China
Christianity in Hebei
Xingtai